ma-con is a German motor racing team. It was founded in 2001 by Marian Hamprecht. The team started racing in the Formula Renault 2000 Eurocup and Formula Renault 2000 Germany in 2002. Currently the team competes in the FIA Formula 3 European Championship. The team always focussed on regional and continental championships in Germany and Europe.

Over time, the team entered using different names, namely ma-con Motorsport, ma-con Racing and ma-con Engineering alongside the common ma-con name. For the 2011 ADAC Formel Masters season the team run a second entry named Krafft Walzen.

History
Founded in 2001 by successful German F3 team manager Marian Hamprecht, the team run in multiple Formula 1 feeder series and gained multiple success in the lower categories of open-wheel racing. After an early campaign in the 2002 and 2003 Formula Renault 2000 Eurocup seasons, the team bought out the Den Blå Avis outfit and thus appeared on the grid of the 2004 FIA F3000 Championship. Despite finishing third in the team's standings in their rookie season and pushing series veteran Tomáš Enge to fourth in the driver's championship, the team discontinued their entry and rather supported Enge's 2005 IRL entry, while joining the Italian F3000 grid with an all-Czech team. Despite even more success in the Italian F3000, the team took a break from racing after 2005.

In 2008 the team joined the ADAC Formel Masters to built up a junior team spanning different tiers of feeder series, leading into the graduation of André Rudersdorf and Sven Müller within their team onto higher levels of open-wheel racing.

In order to re-gain momentum of their 2012 FIA Formula 3 European Championship campaign the team closed down their ADAC Formel Masters operation despite one driver's and one team's title. The team signed British drivers Emil Bernstorff and Tom Blomqvist. Blomqvist had two podiums, while Bernstorff had only one. The team finished fourth in the teams' championship of 2012 Formula 3 Euro Series. The team also participated with Rudersdorf in Austrian Formula 3 Cup and in the Trophy Class of the German Formula Three Championship. He won both titles.

This, however, didn't bring the success the team hoped for and stopped operating after the 2013 season. The team operated Christopher Höher's car in the Most round of the 2015 Remus F3 Cup in order to test Oreca F3 engine in the race conditions. He took one podium, but it was the only weekend for the ma-con crew, as in the Brno round Höher returned to Franz Wöss Racing's Dallara F308 Opel-Spiess.

In 2018 ma-con made the announcement to re-join FIA Formula 3 European Championship with German driver Julian Hanses after four-year break.

Former series results

FIA European Formula 3 Championship

† Shared results with Van Amersfoort Racing

* Season still in progress.

Formula Renault 2000 Eurocup/Masters

Formula Renault 2000 Germany

International Formula 3000 Series

Italian Formula 3000 Championship

† Shared results with Sighinolfi

ADAC Formel Masters

Notes: Brinkmann, Rudersdorf and Nielsen competed for ma-con's second entry, Krafft Walzen. However, they had to switch to ma-con's main team for the Austrian round, as the deal with Krafft Walzen didn't include races in another country and thus are all included in ma-con's statistics.
† Shared results with other teams

Formula 3 Euro Series

German Formula 3 Trophy Class

Austria Formula 3 Cup/Remus F3 Cup

† Shared results with the other team

Timeline

References

External links
 
ma-con Motorsport at Speedsport Magazine

International Formula 3000 teams
FIA Formula 3 European Championship teams
Formula Renault Eurocup teams
Auto GP teams
German Formula 3 teams
Formula 3 Euro Series teams
British Formula Three teams
German auto racing teams